The University of Kentucky Wildcats football team has had 206 players drafted into the National Football League (NFL) since the league began holding drafts in 1936.  Because of the NFL—AFL merger agreement, the history of the AFL is officially recognized by the NFL and therefore this list includes the AFL draft (1960—1966) and the common draft (1967—1969). This includes 16 players taken in the first round and one overall number one pick, Tim Couch in the 1999 NFL draft.

Each NFL franchise seeks to add new players through the annual NFL draft. The draft rules were last updated in 2009. The team with the worst record the previous year picks first, the next-worst team second, and so on. Teams that did not make the playoffs are ordered by their regular-season record with any remaining ties broken by strength of schedule. Playoff participants are sequenced after non-playoff teams, based on their round of elimination (wild card, division, conference, and Super Bowl). Prior to the merger agreements in 1966, the American Football League (AFL) operated in direct competition with the NFL and held a separate draft. This led to a bidding war over top prospects between the two leagues. As part of the merger agreement on June 8, 1966, the two leagues held a multiple-round "common draft". Once the AFL officially merged with the NFL in 1970, the common draft became the NFL draft.

Key

Selections

References

Lists of National Football League draftees by college football team

Kentucky Wildcats NFL draft